Malachiinae is a subfamily of beetles of the family Melyridae and having a global distribution.

Description 
Malachiinae have peculiar orange structures along the sides of the abdomen, which may be everted and saclike or withdrawn into the body and inconspicuous.

The most common North American species belongs to the genus Collops (C. quadrimaculatus) and is reddish, with two bluish black spots on each elytron.

Selected genera 

 Ablechrus
 Afrocarphurus
 Anthocomus
 Anthomalachius
 Apalochrus
 Apteromalachius
 Attalus
 Attalusinus
 Attalomimus
 Axinotarsus
 Balanophorus
 Brachemys
 Brachyhedibius
 Carphuroides
 Carphuromorphus
 Carphurus
 Cephalogonia
 Cephaloncus
 Cerapheles
 Ceratistes
 Chaetocoelus
 Charopus
 Choresine
 Clanoptilus
 Collops
 Colotes
 Condylops
 Cordylepherus
 Cyrtosus
 Dromanthomorphus
 Ebaeus
 Endeodes
 Falsolaius
 Fortunatius
 Haplomalachius
 Helcogaster
 Hypebaeus
 Ifnidius
 Laius
 Malachiomimus
 Malachius
 Metachoresine
 Micrinus
 Microcarphurus
 Microlipus
 Neocarphurus
 Nepachys
 Nodopus
 Pelochrus
 Planasiella
 Protapalochrus
 Psiloderes
 Sphinginus
 Tanaops
 Telocarphurus
 Temnopsophus
 Transvestitus
 Troglops
 Trophimus

References

External links 
 Malachiinae at Fauna Europaea
 
 
 

Melyridae
Beetle subfamilies